This list contains the names of albums that contain a hidden track and also information on how to find them. Not all printings of an album contain the same track arrangements, so some copies of a particular album may not have the hidden track(s) listed below. Some of these tracks may be hidden in the pregap, and some hidden simply as a track following the listed tracks. The list is ordered by artist name using the surname where appropriate.

 Yajaira: Lento y real (2001): The track "Alcohol" from their debut album has been added as hidden track on the European pressing of this album, starting some 5 minutes after "Sangra el cielo" has ended.
 Rachael Yamagata, Happenstance (2004): Ode To... plays several minutes after the end of Quiet.
 Akira Yamaoka, iFUTURELIST (2006): Although the bonus track "SYSTEM LOVE 7.5.5" is listed on the track listing on the booklet, it is preceded by a large chunk of silence.
 "Weird Al" Yankovic:
 Off the Deep End: "Bite Me" (Ten minutes after "You Don't Love Me Anymore")
 Running with Scissors: In the enhanced CD, A Secret Movie file in which Al talks about his life and his fans as he travels to his parents’ home.
 Yeah Yeah Yeahs, Fever to Tell (2003): "Poor Song" - Also known as "Hidden Song" (A slow track that begins at 4:24 of the eleventh track Modern Romance of the album. The song is sometimes played as an encore during live performances.)
 Yes:
 On a reissued version of Fragile, after the abrupt ending of "Heart of the Sunrise," a door opens and a reprise of the earlier track "We Have Heaven" (which ends with the sound of a door slamming shut) can be heard.  This also appears on the early pressings of the LP.
 Open Your Eyes: An untitled track, consisting of nature sounds and vocal snippets of the songs from the album, is heard after the album's final track "The Solution."
 Pete Yorn, Musicforthemorningafter: "A Girl Like You" follows the final track "Simonize"
 You Am I: On the album Hourly, Daily, "Forget It Sister" is an unlisted track that appears on the final track, "Who Takes Who Home (Goodnight)," at 6:03 after a 2:47 period of silence.
 The Young Knives: Superabundance On the last track, 12 "Current of the River," the secret track "Long Cool Drinks by the Pool" begins after 2 minutes.

See also
 List of backmasked messages
 List of albums with tracks hidden in the pregap

References 

Y